Manuel Fernandes may refer to:

 Manuel Fernandes (rower), rower who represented Portugal at the 1996 Summer Olympics
 Manuel Fernandes (footballer, born 1951), former Portuguese football forward during the late 1970s and 1980s, later a manager
 Manuel Fernandes (footballer, born 1986), Portuguese football midfielder

See also
 Manuel Fernandez (disambiguation)
 Manny Fernandez (disambiguation)